Integral nationalism is a type of nationalism that originated in 19th-century France, was theorized by Charles Maurras and mainly expressed in the ultra-royalist circles of Action Française. The doctrine is also called Maurrassisme.

Foundations

National decline and decadence 
Integral nationalism sought to be a counter-revolutionary doctrine, providing a national doctrine that could ensure the territorial cohesion and grandeur of the French state. Its worldview was based on several precepts. Firstly, method: the principle of "Politics first!", that is, that the nationalist, political Catholic and monarchist movements must focus their efforts on changing the political and constitutional order, rather than accepting the victory of radical republicanism and displacing their activity into social or cultural pursuits. Secondly, the belief that the Enlightenment in general and French Revolution in particular had broken a traditional social contract: Maurras held that, by stressing allegiance to the cultural and political nation-state, they had erased an older patriotism based on allegiance to more 'organic' units such as family, petit pays and monarchy. Finally, a moral component: Maurras regarded French society, as of the turn of the twentieth century, as having slid from a Golden Age into a period of decadence and corruption incarnated by the military defeat of 1870-1 and the cultural clash of the Dreyfus affair.

To his mind, the French national community had seen its period of geopolitical grandeur under the absolutist regime of Louis XIV where religion and politics were merged under the absolute authority of the monarch. Maurras blamed French national decline on the overthrow of the cultural and political system of the Ancien Régime, its replacement with the revolutionary and romantic form of liberalism born of the French Revolution (known as Radicalism), and the century of political and constitutional conflict that followed after 1789. Thus Maurras imagined that the introduction of such ideas into the body politic could only have come from outside influences: Freemasons, Protestants, Jews and foreigners (whom he labelled 'Metics') Together these four communities represented, to Maurras, 'Anti-France' and could never be integrated into the French nation.

Order, reason, classicism, authority and liberty 
In this search for a restoration of the constitutional, political and cultural order of the Old Regime, Maurras advocated a political system based on strong authority, a belief in the innate reason of natural law, and a rejection of chaotic romanticism and modernism in favour of orderly classical aesthetic values. His philosophical influences included Plato and Aristotle, Dante and Thomas Aquinas, Auguste Comte and Joseph de Maistre. His historical influences range from Sainte-Beuve to Fustel de Coulanges through Hippolyte Taine and Ernest Renan. But the Jacobin centralism of the French state also aggrieved him: as a Provençal regionalist, he advocated a central state that would yield before traditional local or regional privileges, arguing that only the old monarchy could find this balance.

In its search for the cohesion of an idealised national community, Maurras's political project thus revolved around three major axes:

 Politically: the exaltation of national interest, and with it the exclusion from the national community of the Protestants, Jews, Freemasons and foreigners held to be intrinsically 'un-French' ("France alone");
 Institutionally, a system designed to balance respect for local cultural particularities and political liberties (the pays réel, or 'true country') with the overarching interest of the state (that is, the monarchy);
 Morally, a preponderant role to be granted to the Catholic Church, as a unifying cultural element, a source of social order, and an ideological agent of the central state.

Characteristics

Positivist nationalism
Integral nationalism seeks to recover natural laws by observing facts and drawing upon historical experiences, even if it cannot contradict the metaphysical justifications which constitutes the true foundation for Christians; for positivism, for the Action Française, was by no means a doctrine of explanation, but only a method of ascertainment; it was by observing that the hereditary monarchy was the regime most in conformity with the natural, historical, geographical, and psychological conditions of France that Maurras had become monarchist: "Natural laws exist," he wrote; "a believer must therefore consider forgetting these laws as impious negligence. He respects them all the more because he calls them the work of eternal Providence and goodness."

Counter-revolutionary nationalism

Maurras's nationalism is meant to be integral in that the monarchy is, according to him, part of the essence of the French nation and tradition. Royalism is integral nationalism because without a king, all that the nationalists want to keep will weaken first and then perish.

Decentralizing nationalism
Maurras is an opponent of Napoleonic centralization. He believes that this centralization, which results in statism and bureaucracy - thus joining the ideas of Joseph Proudhon - is inherent in the democratic system. He asserts that republics last only through centralization, with only monarchies strong enough to decentralize. Maurras denounces the insidious use of the word decentralization by the state, which allows it to deconcentrate its power while giving itself a prestige of freedom. What good is it to create universities in the provinces if the state centrally controls them anyway?

A social nationalism
Despite the measured and cautious support he gave to the Proudhon Circle, a circle of intellectuals launched by young monarchists hostile to liberal capitalism and calling for union with the revolutionary syndicalist movement inspired by Georges Sorel, Charles Maurras defended a social policy closer to that of René de La Tour du Pin; Maurras does not like Georges Sorel and Édouard Berth the systematic process of the bourgeoisie where he sees a possible support. In the class struggle, Maurras prefers to propose, as in England, a form of national solidarity of which the king can constitute the keystone.

Non-expansionist nationalism
Maurras is hostile to the colonial expansion impelled by republican governments that diverts from revenge against Germany and disperses its forces; moreover, it is hostile to the Jacobin and Republican assimilation policy which aims at imposing French culture on peoples with their own culture. Like Lyautey, he thinks that France must be made to love France and not to impose French culture in the name of an abstract universalism.

This last conception attracts him favors in the elites of the colonized peoples; Ferhat Abbas, for example, is an Algerian maurassian: he is the founder of L'Action Algerienne, an organ claiming integral nationalism. This movement fights for the adoption of concrete proposals: all are in the direction of local democracy and organized, the only form of democracy for which Maurras advocated, because in his opinion it is the only truly real one: autonomy of local and regional indigenous corporations, autonomy in social and economic regulation, universal suffrage in municipal elections, wide representation of corporations, communes, notables and native chiefs, constituting an assembly with the French government.

If he was hostile to colonial expansion, Maurras was then hostile to the brutal liquidation of the French colonial empire after World War II, prejudicial to him as much to the interests of France as those of the colonized peoples.

Non-racist nationalism

Maurras's national theory rejects the messianism and ethnicism that can be found in the German nationalists who inherit Fichte. The nation he describes corresponds to Renan's political and historical meaning in What is a nation?, to the living hierarchies that Taine describes in The Origins of Contemporary France, to the friendships described by Bossuet. In essence, Maurras proposed a form of civic nationalism that was aggressively exclusionist: like the republican civic nationalism of the left, it sought to forge a national community out of the disparate linguistic and regional ethnicities of the French state - Bretons and Alsatians, Basques and Corsicans, Occitans and Flemings, et cetera; it differed from that of the republicans by establishing  the criteria for the national community on traditionalist grounds: Catholicism, agrarianism and historic rule under the French monarchy. Thus it took a different direction  to the racial or ethno-linguistic nationalism of the German radical right but ended up with a similar degree of vehement xenophobia and anti-semitism, as it considered some ethnic, linguistic or religious communities as belonging to the French nation but not others.

Influence in other countries
Maurras and the Action française have been influential on different thinkers claiming a counterrevolutionary, anti-Enlightenment and Christian (particularly Catholic) nationalism in the world.

In Britain, Maurras was followed and admired by writers and philosophers and by several British correspondents, academics and journal editors. In 1917, he was contracted by Huntley Carter of the New Age and The Egoist.

Many of his poems were translated and published in Britain, where Maurras has many readers among the High Church of Anglicanism and conservative circles. Among his reader, there is T.S. Eliot. Eliot found the reasons for his antifascism in Maurras whose anti-liberalism is traditionalist to the benefit of a certain idea of monarchy and hierarchy. Music within me, which takes up in translation the main pieces of La Musique intérieure will be published in 1946, under the leadership of Count G.W.V. Potcoki of Montalk, director and founder of The Right Review.

In Portugal, António de Oliveira Salazar ruled the country from 1932 to 1968 and admired Maurras. Even though he was not a monarchist; he expressed his condolences to Maurras's death in 1952. Integral nationalism has sometimes been considered one of the sources of inspiration for Salazar's regime in Portugal and Francisco Franco's in Spain. Both leaders respected Maurras but did not claim him by setting up a federalist or royalist system. In Spain, Maurras and his integral nationalism were, however, highly influential upon the nationalist and Catholic right during the first half of the twentieth century. That was initially the case for the political current known as 'Maurism' (after the conservative leader Antonio Maura) in the 1910s and early 1920s. Under the Second Spanish Republic, Maurras's integral nationalism was the chief influence upon the ultramonarchists, led by José Calvo Sotelo, who founded the counter-revolutionary journal Acción Española (1931–36) and its party-political emanation, Renovación Española (1933–37). Maurras's ideas were also influential in Franco's National Catholicism.

In the Kingdom of Yugoslavia, Dimitrije Ljotić and his Yugoslav National Movement (Zbor) were heavily influenced by Maurras's ideas. Ljotić was influenced when he was studying in France and attended various meetings.

In Mexico, Jesús Guiza y Acevedo, nicknamed "Little Maurras", and the historian  were influenced by Maurras.

In Peru, José de la Riva-Agüero y Osma was influenced by Maurras. The great Peruvian reactionary thinker admired his monarchical doctrine and met him in 1913.

In Argentina, the Argentine military Juan Carlos Onganía, just like Alejandro Agustín Lanusse, had participated in the "Cursillos de la Cristiandad", as well as the Dominicans Antonio Imbert Barrera and Elías Wessin y Wessin, military opponents to the restoration of the 1963 Constitution.

See also
 Charles Maurras
 Chauvinism
 Integralism
 Royalist

References

External links 
 Peter Alter's "Nationalism" at Amazon.com

Nationalism
Political theories